David Rissik (born 10 December 1969) is a South African equestrian. He competed in the individual eventing at the 1992 Summer Olympics.

References

External links
 

1969 births
Living people
South African male equestrians
Olympic equestrians of South Africa
Equestrians at the 1992 Summer Olympics
Place of birth missing (living people)